Nancy Green (March 4, 1834 – August 30, 1923) was an American former enslaved woman and one of the first African-American models hired to promote a corporate trademark as "Aunt Jemima". The famous Aunt Jemima recipe was not her recipe, but she became the advertising world's first living trademark.

Biography  
Nancy Hayes (or Hughes) was born enslaved on March 4, 1834.
Montgomery County Historical Society oral history places her birth at a farm on Somerset Creek, six miles outside Mount Sterling in Montgomery County, Kentucky. She had at least two and as many as four children (one of whom was born in 1862) with George Green. Local farmers from that area named Green raised tobacco, hay, cattle, and hogs. There were no birth certificates or marriage licenses for enslaved people.

Nancy Green has been variously described as a servant, nurse, nanny, housekeeper, and cook for Charles Morehead Walker and his wife Amanda.
She also served the family's next generation, again as a nanny and a cook. Walker's two sons later became well known as Chicago Circuit Judge Charles M. Walker, Jr., and Dr. Samuel J. Walker.

By the end of the American Civil War, Green had already lost her husband and children. She lived in a wood frame shack (still standing as of 2014) behind a grand home on Main Street in Covington, Kentucky.
She moved with the Walkers from Kentucky to Chicago in the early 1870s, before the birth of Samuel's youngest child in 1872.
The Walker family initially settled in a swank residential district near Ashland Avenue and Washington Boulevard called the "Kentucky Colony", then home to many transplanted Kentuckians.

On the recommendation of Judge Walker, she was hired by the R.T. Davis Milling Company in St. Joseph, Missouri, to represent "Aunt Jemima", an advertising character named after a song from a minstrel show. They were looking for a Mammy archetype to promote their product.

At the age of 59, Green made her debut as Aunt Jemima at the 1893 World's Columbian Exposition held in Chicago, beside the "world's largest flour barrel" (24 feet high), where she operated a pancake-cooking display, sang songs, and told romanticized stories about the Old South (claiming it was a happy place for blacks and whites alike).

After the Expo, Green was reportedly offered a lifetime contract to adopt the Aunt Jemima moniker and promote the pancake mix; however, it is likely the offer was part of the lore created for the character rather than Green herself.
This marked the beginning of a major promotional push by the company that included thousands of personal appearances and Aunt Jemima merchandising. She appeared at fairs, festivals, flea markets, food shows, and local grocery stores. Her arrival was heralded by large billboards featuring the caption, "I's in town, honey."

Despite her "lifetime contract", she portrayed the role for no more than 20 years.
She refused to cross the ocean for the 1900 Paris exhibition.
She was replaced by Agnes Moodey, "a negress of 60 years", who was then reported as the original Aunt Jemima.

In 1910, at age 76, Green was still working as a residential housekeeper according to the census.
Few people were aware of her role as Aunt Jemima.
Green lived with nieces and nephews in Chicago's Fuller Park and Grand Boulevard neighborhoods into her old age.
At the time of her death, she was living with her great-nephew and his wife.

Religion and advocacy
Green was active in the Chicago Olivet Baptist Church.
During her lifetime, it grew significantly, becoming the largest African-American church in the United States, with a membership at that time of over 9,000.

She used her stature as a spokesperson to advocate against poverty and in favor of equal rights for individuals in Chicago.

Death
Green died on August 30, 1923, at the age of 89 in Chicago, when a car collided with a laundry truck and "hurtled" onto the sidewalk where she was standing.
She is buried in a pauper's grave near a wall in the northeast quadrant of Chicago's Oak Woods Cemetery.

Grave marker
Her grave was unmarked and unknown until 2015.
Sherry Williams, founder of the Bronzeville Historical Society, spent 15 years uncovering Green's resting place.
Williams received approval to place a headstone. Williams reached out to Quaker Oats about whether they would support a monument for Green's grave. "Their corporate response was that Nancy Green and Aunt Jemima aren't the same that Aunt Jemima is a fictitious character."
The headstone was placed on September 5, 2020.

Lawsuit 
In 2014, a lawsuit was filed against Quaker Oats, PepsiCo, and others, claiming that Green and Anna Short Harrington (who portrayed Aunt Jemima starting in 1935) were exploited by the company and cheated out of the monetary compensation they were promised. The plaintiffs were two of Harrington's great-grandsons, and they sought a multi-billion dollar settlement for descendants of Green and Harrington. The lawsuit was dismissed with prejudice and without leave to amend on February 18, 2015.

References

External links

1834 births
1923 deaths
19th-century American slaves
African-American activists
Female characters in advertising
Baptists from Illinois
People from Montgomery County, Kentucky
Quaker Oats Company people
Pedestrian road incident deaths
Road incident deaths in Illinois
19th-century Baptists
20th-century African-American people